Train v. City of New York, 420 U.S. 35 (1975), was a statutory interpretation case in the Supreme Court of the United States. Although one commentator characterizes the case's implications as meaning "[t]he president cannot frustrate the will of Congress by killing a program through impoundment," the Court majority itself made no categorical constitutional pronouncement about impoundment power but focused on the statute's language and legislative history. The words "Constitution," "separation of powers," "separated powers" appear nowhere in the 8-justice majority opinion. The Court's opinion approaches the case as a question of statutory interpretation, albeit one with implications for the American system of checks and balances.

In this case, President Richard Nixon was of the view that the administration was not obligated to disburse all funds allocated by Congress to states seeking federal monetary assistance under the Federal Water Pollution Control Act Amendments of 1972 and ordered the impoundment of substantial amounts of environmental protection funds for a program he vetoed, and which had been overridden by Congress. Russell E. Train, the administrator of the EPA at the time, complied with the order. Several prospective recipients of the funds (which were intended to subsidize construction of municipal sewers and water treatment works), including the city of New York and several other municipalities, promptly sued, seeking judgment that the administrator was obligated to disburse full amounts authorized and an order directing him to make those allotments.

In interpreting the statute and its key terms "sums" (not all sums) and "not to exceed," the Court declined to interpret the statute as a congressional grant of discretion to the President to order the impoundment of substantial amounts of environmental protection funds for a program in these circumstances. The Court's review of the statute's legislative history revealed no intention to grant impoundment authority.

The case arose from facts which pre-date the Congressional Budget and Impoundment Control Act of 1974, though the case was argued after the passing of the 1974 Act. The case showed that the presidential power of impoundment, even without the 1974 Act, was limited by a fair reading of the words Congress chose in its appropriation act. The President is required to carry out the full objectives or scope of programs for which budget authority is provided by the United States Congress. In this case, the President could not order the impoundment of substantial amounts of environmental protection funds for a program he had vetoed, and which Congress had overridden. This finding closed a potential loophole in the Act.

See also
List of United States Supreme Court cases, volume 420

References

Further reading

External links
 

United States Supreme Court cases
United States Supreme Court cases of the Burger Court
United States Constitution Article Two case law
1975 in United States case law
History of New York City